The Standard Libraries is a set of libraries included in the Common Language Infrastructure (CLI) in order to encapsulate many common functions, such as file reading and writing, XML document manipulation, exception handling, application globalization, network communication, threading, and reflection, which makes the programmer's job easier. It is much larger in scope than standard libraries for most other languages, including C++, and is comparable in scope and coverage to the standard libraries of Java. 

The Standard Libraries are the Base Class Library (BCL), Runtime Infrastructure Library (both part of the kernel profile), Network Library, Reflection Library, XML Library (which with the first two listed libraries form the compact profile), Extended Array Library, Parallel Library, Floating Point Library and Vararg Library.

The Framework Class Library (FCL) is the origin of the Standard Libraries as the .NET Framework, which includes the FCL, is the first implementation of the CLI.

Profiles
The main standard libraries are organized into two Standard Profiles, the Kernel Profile, and the Compact Profile. The following standard libraries do not belong to any profile: the Extended Array Library, the Extended Numerics Library, the Parallel Library and the Vararg Library.

Kernel Profile
The Kernel Profile is a subset of the Compact Profile. The Kernel Profile contains the Base Class Library (BCL) and Runtime Infrastructure Library.

Compact Profile
The Compact Profile contains those libraries in the Kernel Profile as well as the Network Library, the Reflection Library and the XML Library.

Libraries

Base Class Library

The Base Class Library is a simple runtime library for modern programming languages. It serves as the Standard for the runtime library for the language C# as well as one of the CLI Standard Libraries. It provides types to represent the built-in data types of the CLI, simple file access, custom attributes, security attributes, string manipulation, formatting, streams, collections, among other things. It defines types in the following namespaces:
System Defines the Object class which all reference type objects derive from (including value-type objects) and the ValueType class which all value type objects derive from. It also defines the base data types like integers, floating point numbers, character, strings, Boolean, enumeration and more. Support for the environment and platform and a command-line interface is provided along with base classes for exceptions and attributes. It defines arrays and delegates, mathematical functions and many other types.
SystemCollections Defines many common container types used in programming, such as dictionaries, hashtables, lists, queues and stacks.
SystemCollectionsGeneric Defines generic types of the container types in the SystemCollections namespace.
SystemDiagnostics Defines types that provide the ability to diagnose applications. It includes event logging, performance counters, tracing and interaction with system processes.
SystemGlobalization Defines types that define culture-related information, including language, country/region, calendars in use, format patterns for dates, currency and numbers and sort order for strings.
SystemIO Defines type that enable reading from and writing to different streams, such as files or other data streams. Also provides a connection to the file system.
SystemSecurity Defines types that represent the security system and permissions.
SystemSecurityPermissions Defines types that control access to operations and resources based on policy.
SystemText Defines types that support various character encodings, regular expressions and a more efficient mechanism for manipulating strings.
SystemThreading Defines types that enable multithreaded programming.

Runtime Infrastructure Library

The Runtime Infrastructure Library provides the services needed by a compiler to target the CLI and the facilities needed to dynamically load types from a stream in a specified file format. It defines types in the following namespaces:

System Defines types for the application domain, pointers, handles and more.
SystemReflection Defines types that provide a managed view of loaded types, methods and fields, and that can dynamically create and invoke types. These types are relevant to the program runtime.
SystemRuntimeCompilerServices Defines types that provide functionality for compiler writers who use managed code to specify attributes in metadata that affect the run-time behavior of the Virtual Execution System.
SystemRuntimeInteropServices Defines types that support Platform Invocation Services (P/Invoke).

Network Library
The Network Library provides simple networking services including direct access to network ports as well as HTTP support. It defines types in the following namespaces:

System Defines types that provide an object representation of a uniform resource identifier (URI) and easy access to the parts of the URI.
System.CollectionsSpecialized Defines specialized and strongly-typed collections; for example, a linked list dictionary, a bit vector, and collections that contain only strings.
SystemNet Defines types that provide a simple programming interface for a number of network protocols.
System.NetSockets Defines type that provide a managed implementation of the Windows Sockets (Winsock) interface for developers who need to tightly control access to the network.

Reflection Library

The Reflection Library provides the ability to examine the structure of types, create instances of types and invoke methods on types, all based on a description of the type. It defines types in the following namespaces:

System Defines the void type, a return value type for a method that does not return a value.
SystemGlobalization Defines type that provide information about a specific culture (called a locale for unmanaged code development). The information includes the names for the culture, the writing system, the calendar used and formatting for dates and sort strings.
SystemReflection Defines types that provide a managed view of loaded types, methods and fields, and that can dynamically create and invoke types.
System.SecurityPermissions Defines types that control access to operations and resources based on policy. These types are relevant to the reflection.

XML Library

The XML Library provides a simple "pull-style" parser for XML. It is designed for resource-constrained devices, yet provides a simple user model. It defines types in the following namespace.

SystemXml Defines types for processing XML.

Extended Array Library
The Extended Array Library provides support for non-vector arrays. That is, arrays that have more than one dimension or
arrays that have non-zero lower bounds. The Extended Array Library doesn't add any extra types, but it does extend the array-handling mechanism.

Extended Numerics Library

The Extended Numerics Library provides support for floating-point (SystemSingle, SystemDouble) and extended-precision (SystemDecimal) data types. Like the Base Class Library, this library is directly referenced by the C# standard.

Parallel Library

The Parallel Library provides easy parallelism for non-expert programmers, so that multithreaded CPUs can be exploited.

Vararg Library

The Vararg Library provides support for dealing with variable-length argument lists.

See also
List of data types of the Standard Libraries
Framework Class Library

References

External links
Ecma International, Standard ECMA-335, Common Language Infrastructure (CLI), 6th edition (June 2012)
Ecma International, Technical Report TR/84, Common Language Infrastructure (CLI) - Information Derived from Partition IV XML File, 6th edition (June 2012)

Common Language Infrastructure